The McGuff Companies consist of three entities: a wholesale distributor of medical supplies, a compounding pharmacy, and a pharmaceutical manufacturing facility which produces sterile injectables for national and international distribution. The McGuff Companies have been featured in the International Journal of Pharmaceutical Compounding (IJPC).

Corporate structure

McGuff Company, Inc. (MCI) 
The McGuff Company, Inc. is a medical products wholesale distributor of pharmaceutical and medical products, and oral nutritional supplements. Founded in 1972 and incorporated in 1984, the company initially provided a full range of disposable medical office products and specialized in parenterals ranging from vaccines to vitamin B12.

As a VAWD accredited distributor, The McGuff Company has been independently audited to verify compliance with state and federal laws, reviewed and audited to meet VAWD requirements.

McGuff Compounding Pharmacy (CPS)
McGuff Compounding Pharmacy Services, Inc.
One of the first pharmacies in California to earn PCAB’s Seal of Accreditation, McGuff is a state-of-the-art, ISO-accredited pharmacy.  It operates a secure online pharmacy website for current customers. CPS compounds a variety of medications, including sterile injections, troches, capsules, creams, suppositories, gels, solutions, and suspensions.

McGuff Compounding Pharmacy operates under U.S. Pharmacopoeia (USP) process standards General Chapters <797> Pharmaceutical Compounding – Sterile Preparations and <795> Pharmaceutical Compounding – Nonsterile Preparations and General Chapter <1075> Good Compounding Practices.

McGuff Pharmaceuticals, Inc. (MPI)
Incorporated in 2002, McGuff Pharmaceuticals, Inc. is an FDA reviewed cGMP manufacturer of sterile injectable drugs.  MPI maintains offices in the United States and Canada and Develops drugs for clinical trials.

Qualifications
Qualifications of McGuff CPS and McGuff Pharmaceuticals
Clinical Trial: University of California, Los Angeles (UCLA); University of California, Irvine (UCI); Long Beach Memorial Medical Center and others
Certificates: American National Standard; ISO 9001:2000 Quality Systems-Model for Quality Assurance
Inspections: California State Board of Pharmacy, the U.S. Food and Drug Administration (FDA)

References

External links
 McGuff Compounding Pharmacy
 McGuff Pharmaceuticals

Pharmaceutical companies of the United States
Pharmacies of the United States
Pharmaceutical companies established in 1979
Companies based in Santa Ana, California
Business services companies established in 1979
1979 establishments in California
Health care companies based in California